Luca Everink (born 9 February 2001) is a Dutch professional footballer who plays as a defender.

Club career
Born in Diepenveen, Everink started his career at local amateur side DSC before joining the FC Twente/Heracles academy at 11 years of age. He made his Eredivisie debut for the senior Twente side away against SC Cambuur on 28 August 2021. 

On 31 January 2023, Everink's contract with Twente was terminated by mutual consent.

Personal life
Everink is of Indonesian descent through his father, whom he never met.

References

External links
 Career stats & Profile - Voetbal International

2001 births
Dutch people of Indonesian descent
Footballers from Deventer
Living people
Association football fullbacks
Dutch footballers
FC Twente players
Eredivisie players